Petrus "Piet" Michaelis van der Horst (25 October 1903 – 18 February 1983) was a Dutch racing cyclist who competed in the 1928 Summer Olympics. He won the silver medal as part of the Dutch pursuit team.

See also
 List of Dutch Olympic cyclists

References

External links
profile

1903 births
1983 deaths
Dutch male cyclists
Dutch track cyclists
Olympic cyclists of the Netherlands
Cyclists at the 1928 Summer Olympics
Olympic silver medalists for the Netherlands
People from Moerdijk
Olympic medalists in cycling
Medalists at the 1928 Summer Olympics
Cyclists from North Brabant
20th-century Dutch people